Neptis conspicua, or Neave's sailer, is a butterfly in the family Nymphalidae. It is found in Cameroon, the Democratic Republic of the Congo, Uganda, western Kenya, north-western Tanzania, Zambia and possibly Sierra Leone, Togo and Nigeria. The habitat consists of forests.

References

Butterflies described in 1904
conspicua